Wolf Meadow Branch is a  long 1st order tributary to Coddle Creek in Cabarrus County, North Carolina.  This is the only stream of this name in the United States.

Course
Wolf Meadow Branch rises in a pond about 1 mile southwest of Concord, North Carolina and then flows southwest to join Coddle Creek at Roberta Mill.

Watershed
Wolf Meadow Branch drains  of area, receives about 47.1 in/year of precipitation, has a wetness index of 454.27, and is about 28% forested.

References

Rivers of North Carolina
Rivers of Cabarrus County, North Carolina